Talovka is a rural locality (a selo) in Pribaykalsky District, Republic of Buryatia, Russia. The population was 161 as of 2010. There are 6 streets.

Geography 
Talovka is located 44 km southwest of Turuntayevo (the district's administrative centre) by road. Yugovo is the nearest rural locality.

References 

Rural localities in Okinsky District